The 28th national football championship in Vietnam known locally as the Vietnam National A1 Football Cup was played from February 1984 until May 1984

18 teams took part in the competition that was played in four stages; a First Stage featuring 3 groups of 6 teams of which the top four entered the second stage and the bottom clubs entered a relegation stage.

From stage two, the top two teams from two groups of 6 would enter the semi-final stage with the respective winners entering the final to determine the champions.

First stage
Top four advance to the second stage.
Bottom placed teams in each group go into relegation playoff

Group A

Group B

Group C

Second stage
Top two advance to the semi-finals.

Group A

Group B

Semi-finals

Final

Relegation playoff

Vietnamese Super League seasons
1
Viet
Viet